Herbes may refer to:

 , a municipality in Castellón, Valencian Community, Spain.
 , the Catalan name for Herbs de Majorca